Mentalhood is an Indian Hindi drama web series produced by Rupali Guha under her banner Film Farm India for the online streaming platform ZEE5 and ALTBalaji. The series marks the debut of actress Karishma Kapoor and stars Sanjay Suri, Sandhya Mridul, Shilpa Shukla and Shruti Seth.

The series revolves around different natures of mothers and showcases how they manoeuvre their way through unreasonable expectations and they try their best to raise their children. The series explores the multitasking nature of different types of mothers and their ways in leading the best upbringing of their children.

Premise

Meira, a multi-tasking mom, tries to find the right balance in parenting and reaches out to other moms through a blog. Get ready to enjoy the topsy-turvy world of mothers and how they manoeuvre their way through unreasonable expectations and eccentricities to raise their children.

Synopsis

Being A Parent Is Tough! Especially if your child studies at the GI International School where it’s a mom eat mom world to be the best mom! Armed with their own unique shade of motherhood, these 6 supermoms will leave no stone unturned as they fight their way through this Mentalhood where they will not only have to deal with the society, their children and their family, but also compete with other moms! In this battle of moms, which supermom will win the race of motherhood?.

Cast 
 Karishma Kapoor as Meira Sharma : Mom of Amyra (13), Nikhil(10) and Arjun(4) ; Anmol's wife.
 Sanjay Suri as Anmol Sharma : Father of Amyra, Nikhil and Arjun;  Meira's husband.
Dino Morea as Akash : A single Dad of twins (through surrogacy), Naks (Aayush Bhanushali) and Tara (Aayushi Bhanushali) Twins in real life also (4).
 Sandhya Mridul as Anuja Joshi/Ajo : Mom of Mahisha(13) and Atanand (10) ; Tarun's wife.
 Shilpa Shukla as Namrata Dalmia : Mom of Shyasta (10) through adoption ;Kunal's wife.
 Shruti Seth as Diksha Shah : Mom of Nirakar (4) ; Jigar's ex wife.
 Tillotama Shome as Preeti : Mom of Vicky (14) and Timmy (10) ; Gaurav's wife.
 Amrita Puri
 Nikita Katakwar
Rohan Joshi as Jigar Shah

Episodes

References

External links 
 
Mentalhood on ALTBalaji
Mentalhood on ZEE5

Indian drama web series
ALTBalaji original programming
ZEE5 original programming